Pacific Grove Unified School District is a public school district in Monterey County, California, United States. The school district was established in 1895.

History
In 1884, Carrie Lloyd opened a summer school for children in the Chautauqua Hall. In 1885, the Pacific Grove School District was formed and classes were held in the Chautauqua Hall for several years, until the Methodist Episcopal Church and Assembly Hall was built on Lighthouse Avenue in 1888.

References

External links
 

School districts in Monterey County, California
1895 establishments in California
School districts established in 1895